Velaikari Magal is a 1953 Indian Tamil-language drama film directed by C. V. Ranganatha Das and starring N. T. Rama Rao, C. Lakshmi Rajyam, and S. V. Ranga Rao. The film is a remake of the 1952 Telugu film Daasi.

Cast 
N. T. Rama Rao as Ramaiah
C. Lakshmi Rajyam as Lakshmi
S. V. Ranga Rao as Badrinath
Relangi
Kasturi Siva Rao
Doraiswamy Naidu
Suryakantham
Santha Kumari as Parvathamma
T. Kanakam as Durgi
Pushpavalli
Surya Prabha

Production 
After the commercial success of the Telugu film Daasi (1952), C. Lakshmi Rajyam and her husband Sridhar Rao, decided to produce a Tamil version of the film under their banner Rajyam Pictures. The name of the film was inspired by C. N. Annadurai's Velaikari (1949). The film was directed by C.V. Ranganatha Doss and featured music by the duo C. R. Subbaraman – S.Dakshinamoorthy; the cast and crew were retained from the original.

Soundtrack 
The music was composed by the duo Subburaman-Dakshinamurthi. Lyrics were written by K. D. Santhanam and K. Devanarayanan.Playback singers are Pithapuram Nageswara Rao, K. Devanarayanan, S. Dakshinamurthi, M. L. Vasanthakumari, P. Leela and A. P. Komala.

Release 
The film released on 14 January 1953 coinciding with Pongal. The film, unlike the Telugu original, did not fare well at the box office.

References 

1953 films
1950s Tamil-language films
Films scored by Susarla Dakshinamurthi
Tamil remakes of Telugu films
Indian drama films
1953 drama films
Films scored by C. R. Subbaraman